A special election was held in  (in the District of Maine) on March 16, 1818 to fill a vacancy left by the resignation of Albion K. Parris (DR) on February 3, 1818 after being named a judge of the United States District Court for the District of Maine.

Electoral results

Lincoln took his seat on November 16, 1818 and would continue to serve in the 16th, 17th (for  after the separation of Maine), the 18th and part of the 19th Congress (the later two Congresses for  after redistricting)

See also
List of special elections to the United States House of Representatives

References

Massachusetts 1818 20
1818 20
Massachusetts 1818 20
Massachusetts 20
United States House of Representatives 20
March 1818 events
United States House of Representatives 1818 20